Sankalipur is a village in Dharwad district of Karnataka, India.

Demographics 
As of the 2011 Census of India there were 448 households in Sankalipur and a total population of 2,208 consisting of 1,175 males and 1,033 females. There were 235 children ages 0-6.

References

Villages in Dharwad district